Click consonants, or clicks, are speech sounds that occur as consonants in many languages of Southern Africa and in three languages of East Africa. Examples familiar to English-speakers are the tut-tut (British spelling) or tsk! tsk! (American spelling) used to express disapproval or pity, the tchick! used to spur on a horse, and the clip-clop! sound children make with their tongue to imitate a horse trotting.

Anatomically, clicks are obstruents articulated with two closures (points of contact) in the mouth, one forward and one at the back. The enclosed pocket of air is rarefied by a sucking action of the tongue (in technical terminology, clicks have a lingual ingressive airstream mechanism). The forward closure is then released, producing what may be the loudest consonants in the language, although in some languages such as Hadza and Sandawe, clicks can be more subtle and may even be mistaken for ejectives.

IPA notation and what clicks sound like
Click consonants occur at six principal places of articulation. The International Phonetic Alphabet (IPA) provides five letters for these places (there is as yet no dedicated symbol for the sixth). 
 The easiest clicks for English speakers are the dental clicks written with a single pipe, . These are sharp (high-pitched) squeaky sounds made by sucking on the front teeth. A simple dental click is used in English to express pity or to shame someone, or to call a cat or other animal, and is written tut! in British English and tsk! in American English. In many cultures around the Mediterranean a simple dental click is used for "no" in answer to a direct question. They are written with the letter c in Zulu and Xhosa. 
 Next most familiar to English speakers are the lateral clicks, which are written with a double pipe, . A simple lateral click is made in English to get a horse moving, and is conventionally written tchick!. They are written with the letter x in Zulu and Xhosa. 
 Then there are the labial clicks, written with a bull's eye, . These are lip-smacking sounds, but often without the pursing of the lips found in a kiss, that occur in words in only a few languages.

The above clicks sound like affricates, in that they involve a lot of friction. The next two families of clicks are more abrupt sounds that do not have this friction.
 With the alveolar clicks, written with an exclamation mark, the tip of the tongue is pulled down abruptly and forcefully from the roof of the mouth, sometimes using a lot of jaw motion, and making a hollow pop! like a cork being pulled from an empty bottle. Something like these sounds may be used for a 'clip-clop' sound as noted above. These sounds can be quite loud. They are written with the letter q in Zulu and Xhosa. 
 The palatal clicks, are made with a flat tongue that is pulled backward rather than downward, and are sharper cracking sounds than the  clicks, like sharply snapped fingers. They are not found in Zulu but are very common in the San languages of southern Africa. 
 Finally, the retroflex clicks are poorly known, being attested from only a single language, Central !Kung. The tongue is curled back in the mouth, and they are both fricative and hollow sounding, but descriptions of these sounds vary between sources. This may reflect dialect differences. They are perhaps most commonly written , but that is an ad hoc transcription.
Technically, these IPA letters transcribe only the forward articulation of the click, not the entire consonant. As the Handbook states, 

Thus technically  is not a consonant, but only one part of the articulation of a consonant, and one may speak of "ǂ-clicks" to mean any of the various click consonants that share the  place of articulation. These differing transcription conventions may reflect differing theoretical analyses of the nature of click consonants, or attempts to address common misunderstandings of clicks.

Languages with clicks

Southern Africa 
Clicks occur in all three Khoisan language families of southern Africa, where they may be the most numerous consonants. To a lesser extent they occur in three neighbouring groups of Bantu languages—which borrowed them, directly or indirectly, from Khoisan. In the southeast, in eastern South Africa, Eswatini, Lesotho, Zimbabwe and southern Mozambique, they were adopted from a Tuu language (or languages) by the languages of the Nguni cluster (especially Zulu, Xhosa and Phuthi, but also to a lesser extent Swazi and Ndebele), and spread from them in a reduced fashion to the Zulu-based pidgin Fanagalo, Sesotho, Tsonga, Ronga, the Mzimba dialect of Tumbuka and more recently to Ndau and urban varieties of Pedi, where the spread of clicks continues. The second point of transfer was near the Caprivi Strip and the Okavango River where, apparently, the Yeyi language borrowed the clicks from a West Kalahari Khoe language; a separate development led to a smaller click inventory in the neighbouring Mbukushu, Kwangali, Gciriku, Kuhane and Fwe languages in Angola, Namibia, Botswana and Zambia. These sounds occur not only in borrowed vocabulary, but have spread to native Bantu words as well, in the case of Nguni at least partially due to a type of word taboo called hlonipha. Some creolised varieties of Afrikaans, such as Oorlams, retain clicks in Khoekhoe words.

East Africa 
Three languages in East Africa use clicks: Sandawe and Hadza of Tanzania, and Dahalo, an endangered South Cushitic language of Kenya that has clicks in only a few dozen words. It is thought the latter may remain from an episode of language shift.

Damin 
The only non-African language known to have clicks as regular speech sounds is Damin, a ritual code once used by speakers of Lardil in Australia. In addition, one consonant in Damin is the egressive equivalent of a click, using the tongue to compress the air in the mouth for an outward (egressive) "spurt".

Use

Spread of clicks from loanwords
Once clicks are borrowed into a language as regular speech sounds, they may spread to native words, as has happened due to hlonipa word-taboo in the Nguni languages. In Gciriku, for example, the European loanword tomate (tomato) appears as cumáte with a click , though it begins with a t in all neighbouring languages.

Marginal usage of clicks 
Scattered clicks are found in ideophones and mimesis in other languages, such as Kongo , Mijikenda  and Hadza  (Hadza does not otherwise have labial clicks). Ideophones often use phonemic distinctions not found in normal vocabulary.

English and many other languages may use bare click releases in interjections, without an accompanying rear release or transition into a vowel, such as the dental "tsk-tsk" sound used to express disapproval, or the lateral tchick used with horses. In a number of languages ranging from the central Mediterranean to Iran, a bare dental click release accompanied by tipping the head upwards signifies "no". Libyan Arabic apparently has three such sounds.

Clicks occasionally turn up elsewhere, as in the special registers twins sometimes develop with each other. In Rwanda, the sequence  may be pronounced either with an epenthetic vowel, or with a light bilabial click, —often by the same speaker.

In Gan, the nursery rhyme is,
 'a goose in the sky'
 'a duck on the ground'
 'a goose lays a goose egg, a goose hatches a goose'
 'a duck lays a duck egg, a duck hatches a duck'
where the  onsets are all pronounced .

Occasionally other languages are claimed to have click sounds in general vocabulary. This is usually a misnomer for ejective consonants, which are found across much of the world.

Position in word 

For the most part, the Southern African Khoisan languages only use root-initial clicks. Hadza, Sandawe and several Bantu languages also allow syllable-initial clicks within roots. In no language does a click close a syllable or end a word, but since the languages of the world that happen to have clicks consist mostly of CV syllables and allow at most only a limited set of consonants (such as a nasal or a glottal stop) to close a syllable or end a word, most consonants share the distribution of clicks in these languages.

Number of click-types in languages 
Most languages of the Khoesan families (Tuu, Kxʼa and Khoe) have four click types: } or variants thereof, though a few have three or five, the last supplemented with either bilabial } or retroflex }. Hadza and Sandawe in Tanzania have three, }. Yeyi is the only Bantu language with four, }, while Xhosa and Zulu have three, }, and most other Bantu languages with clicks have fewer.

Types of clicks
Like other consonants, clicks can be described using four parameters: place of articulation, manner of articulation, phonation (including glottalisation) and airstream mechanism. As noted above, clicks necessarily involve at least two closures, which in some cases operate partially independently: an anterior articulation traditionally represented by the special click symbol in the IPA—and a posterior articulation traditionally transcribed for convenience as oral or nasal, voiced or voiceless, though such features actually apply to the entire consonant. The literature also describes a contrast between velar and uvular rear articulations for some languages.

In some languages that have been reported to make this distinction, such as Nǁng, all clicks have a uvular rear closure, and the clicks explicitly described as uvular are in fact cases where the uvular closure is independently audible: contours of a click into a pulmonic or ejective component, in which the click has two release bursts, the forward (click-type) and then the rearward (uvular) component. "Velar" clicks in these languages have only a single release burst, that of the forward release, and the release of the rear articulation isn't audible. However, in other languages all clicks are velar, and a few languages, such as Taa, have a true velar–uvular distinction that depends on the place rather than the timing of rear articulation and is audible in the quality of the vowel.

Regardless, in most of the literature the stated place of the click is the anterior articulation (called the release or influx), whereas the manner is ascribed to the posterior articulation (called the accompaniment or efflux).

The size of click inventories ranges from as few as three (in Sesotho) or four (in Dahalo), to dozens in the Kxʼa and Tuu (Northern and Southern Khoisan) languages. Taa, the last vibrant language in the latter family, has 45 to 115 click phonemes, depending on analysis (clusters vs. contours), and over 70% of words in the dictionary of this language begin with a click.

Clicks appear more stop-like (sharp/abrupt) or affricate-like (noisy) depending on their place of articulation: In southern Africa, clicks involving an apical alveolar or laminal postalveolar closure are acoustically abrupt and sharp, like stops, whereas labial, dental and lateral clicks typically have longer and acoustically noisier click types that are superficially more like affricates. In East Africa, however, the alveolar clicks tend to be flapped, whereas the lateral clicks tend to be more sharp.

Transcription

The five click places of articulation with dedicated symbols in the International Phonetic Alphabet (IPA) are labial , dental , palatal ("palato-alveolar") , (post)alveolar ("retroflex")  and lateral . In most languages, the alveolar and palatal types are abrupt; that is, they are sharp popping sounds with little frication (turbulent airflow). The labial, dental and lateral types, on the other hand, are typically noisy: they are longer, lip- or tooth-sucking sounds with turbulent airflow, and are sometimes called affricates. (This applies to the forward articulation; both may also have either an affricate or non-affricate rear articulation as well.) (At least in the Nǁng language and Juǀʼhoan, this is associated with a difference in the placement of the rear articulation: "grave" clicks are uvular, whereas "acute" clicks are pharyngeal.) Thus the alveolar click  sounds something like a cork pulled from a bottle (a low-pitch pop), at least in Xhosa; whereas the dental click  is like English tsk! tsk!, a high-pitched sucking on the incisors. The lateral clicks are pronounced by sucking on the molars of one or both sides.

The most populous languages with clicks, Zulu and Xhosa, use the letters c, q, x, by themselves and in digraphs, to write click consonants. Most Khoisan languages, on the other hand (with the notable exceptions of Naro and Sandawe), use a more iconic system based on the pipe . (The exclamation point for the "retroflex" click was originally a pipe with a subscript dot, along the lines of ṭ, ḍ, ṇ used to transcribe the retroflex consonants of India.) There are also two main conventions for the second letter of the digraph as well: voicing may be written with g and uvular affrication with x, or voicing with d and affrication with g (a convention of Afrikaans). In two orthographies of Juǀʼhoan, for example, voiced  is written g! or dq, and  !x or qg. In languages without , such as Zulu,  may be written gq.

The former is not supported by Unicode, and the latter was proposed only in 2020. (Doke's character resembles a down arrow and is here represented by the old Roman numeral for 50; Beach is a double-barred esh.) Doke and Beach used additional or modified letters for voiced and nasal clicks, but they did not catch on.
  The labial and palatal clicks do not occur in written Bantu languages. In the 19th century, they were sometimes written , which might be source of the Doke letter .

There are a few less-well-attested articulations.  A reported subapical retroflex articulation  in Grootfontein !Kung turns out to be alveolar with lateral release, ; Ekoka !Kung has a fricated alveolar click with an s-like release, provisionally transcribed ; and Sandawe has a "slapped" alveolar click, provisionally transcribed  (in turn, the lateral clicks in Sandawe are more abrupt and less noisy than in southern Africa). However, the Khoisan languages are poorly attested, and it is quite possible that, as they become better described, more click articulations will be found.

Formerly when a click consonant was transcribed, two symbols were used, one for each articulation, and connected with a tie bar. However, a tie bar was not often used in practice, and when the manner is tenuis (a simple ), it was often omitted as well. That is,  =  =  =  = . Regardless, elements that do not overlap with the forward release are usually written according to their temporal order: Prenasalisation is always written first ( =  = ), and the non-lingual part of a contour is always written second ( =  = ).

However, it is common to analyse clicks as simplex segments, despite the fact that the front and rear articulations are independent, and to use diacritics to indicate the rear articulation and the accompaniment.

In the literature on Damin, the clicks are transcribed by adding  to the homorganic nasal: .

Places of articulation

Places of articulation are often called click types, releases, or influxes, though 'release' is also used for the accompaniment/efflux. There are seven or eight known places of articulation, not counting slapped or egressive clicks. These are (bi)labial affricated , or "bilabial"; laminal denti-alveolar affricated , or "dental"; apical (post)alveolar plosive , or "alveolar"; laminal palatal plosive , or "palatal"; laminal palatal affricated  (known only from Ekoka !Kung); subapical postalveolar , or "retroflex" (only known from Central !Kung and possibly Damin); and apical (post)alveolar lateral , or "lateral".

Languages illustrating each of these articulations are listed below. Given the poor state of documentation of Khoisan languages, it is quite possible that additional places of articulation will turn up. No language is known to contrast more than five.

Extra-linguistically, Coatlán Zapotec of Mexico uses a linguolabial click, as mimesis for a pig drinking water, and several languages, such as Wolof, use a velar click , long judged to be physically impossible, for backchanneling and to express approval.

The exact place of the alveolar clicks varies between languages. The lateral, for example, is alveolar in Khoekhoe but postalveolar or even palatal in Sandawe; the central is alveolar in Nǀuu but postalveolar in Juǀʼhoan.

Names found in the literature

The terms for the click types were originally developed by Bleek in 1862. Since then there has been some conflicting variation. However, apart from "cerebral" (retroflex), which was found to be an inaccurate label when true retroflex clicks were discovered, Bleek's terms are still considered normative today. Here are the terms used in some of the main references.

{|class="wikitable"
|+ Names in the literature
! Click type !! Bleek (1862) !! Doke (1926)|| IPA (1928) || Beach (1938) || IPA (1949) || IPA (1989) || Unicode || Miller et al. (2009)<ref>Miller, Brugman, Sands, Namaseb, Exter & Collins (2009) Differences in airstream and posterior place of articulation among Nǀuu clicks, Journal of the International Phonetic Association 39, 129–161.</ref> || Vosser (2013)|| other
|-
|  || dental || dental || dental || dental affricative || dental || dental || dental || denti-pharyngeal || dental || alveolar affricated; denti-alveolar; apico-lamino-dental
|-
|  || cerebral || palato-alveolar ||cerebral || alveolar implosive || retroflex || (post-)alveolar || retroflex || central alveo-uvular || alveolar || palatal; palatal retroflex; apico-palatal
|-
|  || lateral || lateral || alveolar lateral || lateral affricative || lateral || (alveolar) lateral || lateral || lateral alveo-uvular || lateral-alveolar || post-alveolar lateral; lateral apico-alveo-palatal
|-
|  || palatal || alveolar|| velar || denti-alveolar implosive || velar || palatoalveolar || alveolar || palato-pharyngeal || palatal || alveolar instantaneous; dental
|-
|  ||  || || ||  ||  || bilabial || bilabial || labio-uvular || bilabial || labial
|}

The dental, lateral and bilabial clicks are rarely confused, but the palatal and alveolar clicks frequently have conflicting names in older literature, and non-standard terminology is fossilized in Unicode.

The back-vowel constraint

In several languages, including Nama and Juǀʼhoan, the alveolar click types  and  only occur, or preferentially occur, before back vowels, whereas the dental and palatal clicks occur before any vowel. The effect is most noticeable with the high front vowel . In Nama, for example, the diphthong  is common but  is rare after alveolar clicks, whereas the opposite is true after dental and palatal clicks. This is a common effect of uvular or uvularised consonants on vowels in both click and non-click languages. The back-vowel constraint is also triggered by labial clicks, though not by labial stops. Clicks subject to this constraint involve a sharp retraction of the tongue during release.

Miller and colleagues (2003) used ultrasound imaging to show that the rear articulation of the alveolar clicks in Nama is substantially different from that of palatal and dental clicks. Specifically, the shape of the body of the tongue in palatal clicks is very similar to that of the vowel , and involves the same tongue muscles, so that sequences such as  involved a simple and quick transition. The rear articulation of the alveolar clicks, however, is several centimetres further back, and involves a different set of muscles in the uvular region. This makes the transition required for  much more complex and the timing more difficult than the shallower and more forward tongue position of the palatal clicks.

Languages do not all behave alike. However, the occlusive contour clicks pattern like the simple clicks, and  does not trigger the back-vowel constraint. This is because they involve tongue-root raising rather than tongue-root retraction in the uvular-pharyngeal region. However, in Gǀwi, which is otherwise largely similar, both  and  trigger the back-vowel constraint (Miller 2009).

Manners of articulation

Click manners are often called click accompaniments or effluxes, but both terms have met with objections on theoretical grounds.

There is a great variety of click manners, both simplex and complex, the latter variously analysed as consonant clusters or contours. With so few click languages, and so little study of them, it is also unclear to what extent clicks in different languages are equivalent. Such suspected allophones/allographs are listed on a common row in the table below.

This may be an effect of epiglottalised voiced consonants, because voicing is incompatible with epiglottalisation.

Phonation
As do other consonants, clicks vary in phonation. Oral clicks are attested with four phonations: tenuis, aspirated, voiced and breathy voiced (murmured). Nasal clicks may also vary, with plain voiced, breathy voiced / murmured nasal, aspirated and unaspirated voiceless clicks attested (the last only in Taa). The aspirated nasal clicks are often said to have 'delayed aspiration'; there is nasal airflow throughout the click, which may become voiced between vowels, though the aspiration itself is voiceless. A few languages also have pre-glottalised nasal clicks, which have very brief prenasalisation but have not been phonetically analysed to the extent that other types of clicks have.

All languages have nasal clicks, and all but Dahalo and Damin also have oral clicks. All languages but Damin have at least one phonation contrast as well.

Complex clicks
Clicks may be pronounced with a third place of articulation, glottal. A glottal stop is made during the hold of the click; the (necessarily voiceless) click is released, and then the glottal hold is released into the vowel. Glottalised clicks are very common, and they are generally nasalised as well. The nasalisation cannot be heard during the click release, as there is no pulmonic airflow, and generally not at all when the click occurs at the beginning of an utterance, but it has the effect of nasalising preceding vowels, to the extent that the glottalised clicks of Sandawe and Hadza are often described as prenasalised when in medial position. Two languages, Gǀwi and Yeyi, contrast plain and nasal glottalised clicks, but in languages without such a contrast, the glottalised click is nasal. Miller (2011) analyses the glottalisation as phonation, and so considers these to be simple clicks.

Various languages also have prenasalised clicks, which may be analysed as consonant sequences. Sotho, for example, allows a syllabic nasal before its three clicks, as in nnqane 'the other side' (prenasalised nasal) and seqhenqha 'hunk'.

There is ongoing discussion as to how the distinction between what were historically described as 'velar' and 'uvular' clicks is best described. The 'uvular' clicks are only found in some languages, and have an extended pronunciation that suggests that they are more complex than the simple ('velar') clicks, which are found in all. Nakagawa (1996) describes the extended clicks in Gǀwi as consonant clusters, sequences equivalent to English st or pl, whereas Miller (2011) analyses similar sounds in several languages as click–non-click contours, where a click transitions into a pulmonic or ejective articulation within a single segment, analogous to how English ch and j transition from occlusive to fricative but still behave as unitary sounds. With ejective clicks, for example, Miller finds that although the ejective release follows the click release, it is the rear closure of the click that is ejective, not an independently articulated consonant. That is, in a simple click, the release of the rear articulation is not audible, whereas in a contour click, the rear (uvular) articulation is audibly released after the front (click) articulation, resulting in a double release.

These contour clicks may be linguo-pulmonic, that is, they may transition from a click (lingual) articulation to a normal pulmonic consonant like  (e.g. ); or linguo-glottalic and transition from lingual to an ejective consonant like  (e.g. ): that is, a sequence of ingressive (lingual) release + egressive (pulmonic or glottalic) release. In some cases there is a shift in place of articulation as well, and instead of a uvular release, the uvular click transitions to a velar or epiglottal release (depending on the description,  or ). Although homorganic  does not contrast with heterorganic    in any known language, they are phonetically quite distinct (Miller 2011).

Implosive clicks, e.g. velar  and uvular  are not only possible but easier to produce than modally voiced clicks. However, they are not attested in any language.

Apart from Dahalo, Damin and many of the Bantu languages (Yeyi and Xhosa being exceptions), 'click' languages have glottalized nasal clicks. Contour clicks are restricted to southern Africa, but are very common there: they are found in all members of the Tuu, Kxʼa and Khoe families, as well as in the Bantu language Yeyi.

Variation among languages
In a comparative study of clicks across various languages, using her own field work as well as phonetic descriptions and data by other field researchers, Miller (2011) posits 21 types of clicks that contrast in manner or airstream. The homorganic and heterorganic affricated ejective clicks do not contrast in any known language, but are judged dissimilar enough to keep separate. Miller's conclusions differ from those of the primary researcher of a language; see the individual languages for details.
 Taa (ǃXóõ) and Nǁng (Nǀuu) are Tuu languages, from the two branches of that family.
 ǂʼAmkoe (ǂHoan) and Juǀʼhoan (ǃKung) are Kxʼa languages, from the two branches of that family.
 Korana and Gǀui (Gǁana) are Khoe languages, from the two branches of that family.
(all spoken primarily in South Africa, Namibia and Botswana; Khoekhoe is similar to Korana except it has lost ejective )
 Sandawe and Hadza are language isolates spoken in Tanzania
 Dahalo is a Cushitic language of Kenya
 Xhosa and Yeyi are Bantu languages, from the two geographic areas of that family that have acquired clicks.
(Zulu is similar to Xhosa apart from not having )
 Damin was an initiation jargon in northern Australia.

Each language below is illustrated with Ʞ as a placeholder for the different click types. Under each language are the orthography (in italics, with old forms in parentheses), the researchers' transcription (in ), or allophonic variation (in [brackets]). Some languages also have labialised or prenasalised clicks as well as those listed below.

Yeyi also has prenasalised .

A DoBeS (2008) study of the Western ǃXoo dialect of Taa found several new manners: creaky voiced (the voiced equivalent of glottalised oral), breathy-voiced nasal, prenasalised glottalised (the voiced equivalent of glottalised) and a (pre)voiced ejective. These extra voiced clicks reflect Western ǃXoo morphology, where many nouns form their plural by voicing their initial consonant. DoBeS analyses most Taa clicks as clusters, leaving nine basic manners (marked with asterisks in the table). This comes close to Miller's distinction between simple and contour clicks, shaded light and medium grey in the table.

Phonotactics
Languages of the southern African Khoisan families only permit clicks at the beginning of a word root. However, they also restrict other classes of consonant, such as ejectives and affricates, to root-initial position. The Bantu languages, Hadza and Sandawe allow clicks within roots.

In some languages, all click consonants within known roots are the same phoneme, as in Hadza cikiringcingca  'pinkie finger', which has three tenuis dental clicks. Other languages are known to have the occasional root with different clicks, as in Xhosa ugqwanxa  'black ironwood', which has a slack-voiced alveolar click and a nasal lateral click.

No natural language allows clicks at the ends of syllables or words, but then no languages with clicks allows many consonants at all in those positions. Similarly, clicks are not found in underlying consonant clusters apart from /Cw/ (and, depending on the analysis, /Cχ/), as languages with clicks do not have other consonant clusters than that. Due to vowel elision, however, there are cases where clicks are pronounced in cross-linguistically common types of consonant clusters, such as Xhosa  Snqobile, from Sinqobile (a name), and  isXhosa, from isiXhosa (the Xhosa language).

Like other articulatorily complex consonants, clicks tend to be found in lexical words rather than in grammatical words, but this is only a tendency. In Nǁng, for example, there are two sets of personal pronouns, a full one without clicks and a partial set with clicks (ńg 'I', á 'thou', í 'we all', ú 'you', vs. nǀǹg 'I', gǀà 'thou', gǀì 'we all', gǀù 'you'), as well as other grammatical words with clicks such as ǁu 'not' and nǀa 'with, and'.

Click genesis and click loss
One genetic study concluded that clicks, which occur in the languages of the genetically divergent populations Hadza and !Kung, may be an ancient element of human language. However, this conclusion relies on several dubious assumptions (see Hadza language), and most linguists assume that clicks, being quite complex consonants, arose relatively late in human history. How they arose is not known, but it is generally assumed that they developed from sequences of non-click consonants, as they are found allophonically for doubly articulated consonants in West Africa, for  sequences that overlap at word boundaries in German, and for the sequence  in Ndau and Tonga. Such developments have also been posited in historical reconstruction. For example, the Sandawe word for 'horn', with a lateral affricate, may be a cognate with the root  found throughout the Khoe family, which has a lateral click. This and other words suggests that at least some Khoe clicks may have formed from consonant clusters when the first vowel of a word was lost; in this instance * > * > .

On the other side of the equation, several non-endangered languages in vigorous use demonstrate click loss. For example, the East Kalahari languages have lost clicks from a large percentage of their vocabulary, presumably due to Bantu influence.

Difficulty
Clicks are often presented as difficult sounds to articulate within words. However, children acquire them readily; a two-year-old, for example, may be able to pronounce a word with a lateral click  with no problem, but still be unable to pronounce . Lucy Lloyd reported that after long contact with the Khoi and San, it was difficult for her to refrain from using clicks when speaking English.

See also

 Dental clicks
 Alveolar clicks
 Fricated alveolar clicks
 Retroflex clicks
 Lateral clicks
 Palatal clicks
 Labial clicks
 Nasal clicks
 Glottalised clicks
 Pulmonic-contour clicks
 Ejective-contour clicks
 Click letters
 List of phonetics topics
 Sublaminal lower alveolar click
 Clicking noise

Notes

References

Bibliography
 
 
 Amanda Miller, Levi Namaseb, Khalil Iskarous. 2003. Tongue Body constriction differences in click types. Amanda Miller, 2011. "The Representation of Clicks". In Oostendorp et al. eds., The Blackwell Companion to Phonology. Traill, Anthony & Rainer Vossen. 1997. Sound change in the Khoisan languages: new data on click loss and click replacement''. J African Languages and Linguistics 18:21–56.

External links
 Collection of click-language links and audio samples.
 Hartmut Traunmüller (2003) "Clicks and the idea of a human protolanguage", Phonum 9: 1 – 4 (Umeå University, Dept. of Philosophy and Linguistics)
 Classifying clicks
 A Chinese nursery rhyme with flapped clicks (or search for videos with the words 天上一隻鵝)